United Musicians is an independent music collective founded by Aimee Mann, Michael Penn and Michael Hausman. According to UM's Web site, it is "founded on the principle that every artist should be able to retain copyright ownership of the work he or she has created and that this ownership is the basis for artistic strength and true independence."

Albums released through United Musicians are usually on the artist's own label; for example, UM's first full-length release, Mann's Bachelor No. 2, was on Mann's SuperEgo Records imprint. It is also not limited to musicians; stand-up comedian Patton Oswalt is among the collective's artists.

Releases
 Aimee Mann, Bachelor No. 2 (2000) (SuperEgo Records)
 Bob Mould, Modulate (2002) (Granary Music)
 LoudBomb (Bob Mould side project), Long Playing Grooves (2002) (Granary)
 Aimee Mann, Lost in Space (2002) (SuperEgo)
Lost in Space Special Edition (2004) (SuperEgo)
 Pete Droge, Skywatching (2003) (Puzzle Tree Records)
 The Honeydogs, 10,000 Years (2003)
 Julian Coryell, Rock Star (2004) (Moods Inc.)
 Patton Oswalt, Feelin' Kinda Patton (2004)
 Patton Oswalt, 222 (2004)
 Aimee Mann, Live at St. Ann's Warehouse live album/DVD (2004) (SuperEgo)
 Aimee Mann, The Forgotten Arm (2005) (SuperEgo)
 Michael Penn, Mr. Hollywood Jr., 1947 (2005) (Mimeograph Records/SpinART)
 Marc Cohn, Live '04–'05 live album (2005)
 Aimee Mann, One More Drifter in the Snow (2006) (SuperEgo)
 Aimee Mann, @#%&*! Smilers (2008) (SuperEgo)
 Aimee Mann, Charmer (2012) (SuperEgo)

External links
 United Musicians

American independent record labels